Bréiner Jovanni Ortiz Acevedo (March 3, 1990) is a Colombian footballer who currently plays for Carolina RailHawks in the North American Soccer League.

External links

1990 births
Living people
Colombian footballers
Colombian expatriate footballers
Deportes Quindío footballers
North Carolina FC players
Expatriate soccer players in the United States
North American Soccer League players
Association football midfielders
Footballers from Cali